Ronald Eugene Rivera (born January 7, 1962), nicknamed "Riverboat Ron", is an American football head coach for the Washington Commanders of the National Football League (NFL). He attended the University of California, Berkeley in the early 1980s, where he was recognized as an All-American linebacker for the Golden Bears. Following graduation, he was drafted by the Chicago Bears in the second round of the 1984 NFL Draft and played nine seasons with them, including as a member of the 1985 team that won Super Bowl XX.

Rivera's coaching career began in 1997 when he served as a quality control coach for the Bears. He joined the Philadelphia Eagles as a linebackers coach two years later before rejoining the Bears as their defensive coordinator in 2004. The following year, he was named Assistant Coach of the Year by the PFWA and helped coach linebacker Brian Urlacher into being named Defensive Player of the Year. In 2006, the team made an appearance in Super Bowl XLI. Rivera also interviewed for a few head coaching vacancies around this time. In 2007, he joined the San Diego Chargers coaching linebackers before being promoted to defensive coordinator a year later.

After three years with the Chargers, Rivera was hired as head coach for the Carolina Panthers and would become their all-time leader in wins. He was also recognized as the NFL Coach of the Year in 2013 and 2015 and led the team to an appearance in Super Bowl 50. Rivera was fired midway through the 2019 season due to the teams new ownership wanting change and became Washington's head coach in 2020. He was diagnosed with squamous cell carcinoma that same year but was considered cancer free by early 2021. He is the only coach in NFL history to have led a team with a losing record to the playoffs more than once, doing so with Carolina in 2014 and Washington in 2020.

Early years
Rivera was born in Fort Ord, California on January 7, 1962. His father, Eugenio Rivera, was a Puerto Rican commissioned officer in the US Army stationed in California. There Eugenio met his future wife, Dolores, who is of Mexican descent. The family moved often due to his father's military service, with Rivera being educated in bases in Germany, Panama, and Washington, D.C. The family eventually settled in Marina, California, where he attended and played football at Seaside High School before graduating in 1980.

Playing career

Cal Golden Bears (NCAA)
Rivera was granted a football scholarship at the University of California, Berkeley, where he led the Golden Bears in tackles as a linebacker during his three years there. For his final season in 1983, Rivera received several awards and honors for his performance, including being named a consensus All-American, Pac-10 Football Defensive Player of the Year along with Arizona linebacker Ricky Hunley, the Pop Warner Trophy, and being named MVP of the East–West Shrine Game.

Chicago Bears (NFL)
Rivera was selected in the second round of the 1984 NFL Draft by the Chicago Bears, playing for them as a rotational linebacker and special teamer. In 1985, Rivera became the first American of Puerto Rican descent to win a Super Bowl, as the Bears defeated the New England Patriots in Super Bowl XX. He was named the team's Man of the Year in 1988, and was named their Ed Block Courage Award recipient the following year. He played nine seasons for them before retiring after the 1992 season, playing in 137 games with 62 starts, 392 tackles, 7.5 sacks, 5 forced fumbles, 4 fumble recoveries, and 9 interceptions.

Coaching career
In 1993, Rivera went to work for WGN-TV and SportsChannel Chicago as a television analyst covering the Bears and college football. In 1997, he joined the Bears as a defensive quality control coach.

Philadelphia Eagles
In 1999, Rivera was named linebackers coach for the Philadelphia Eagles under newly hired head coach Andy Reid. During his tenure, the Eagles advanced to the NFC championship for three consecutive seasons. He also was credited with developing linebacker Jeremiah Trotter into a two-time All-Pro.

Chicago Bears
Rivera was named defensive coordinator of the Chicago Bears on January 23, 2004. In 2005, the Bears defense was rated second in the league by total yardage, with the team winning the NFC North division with a record of 11-5 before losing in the divisional round of the playoffs to the Carolina Panthers. For his efforts that year, Rivera was named Assistant Coach of the Year by the Pro Football Writers Association. In 2006, the Bears had the league's third-ranked defense in terms of points allowed, which helped them advance to Super Bowl XLI. Although the Bears lost to the Indianapolis Colts 29–17, the defense's success earned Rivera recognition among franchises looking for new head coaches. In February 2007, it was announced that Rivera's contract with the Bears would not be extended due to failed negotiations. Around the same time, he interviewed for several vacant head coaching positions around the league, including with the Pittsburgh Steelers and Dallas Cowboys.

San Diego Chargers
Rivera was hired by the San Diego Chargers to become their inside linebackers coach in February 2007 and was promoted to defensive coordinator after the team fired Ted Cottrell in October 2008.

Carolina Panthers

On January 11, 2011, Rivera was hired to become the fourth head coach of the Carolina Panthers. He was the third Latino in NFL history to become a head coach, following Tom Fears and Tom Flores. During his first year, the Panthers went 6–10 and finished third in the division. In 2012, the Panthers finished 7–9 and finished second in the division. During his first two years with the Panthers, Rivera was known for his conservative decision-making, with journalists noting his record of 2–14 record in games decided by less than a touchdown. Following an 1–3 start to the 2013 season, reports suggested that the Panthers were already contemplating getting a new head coach. As a result, Rivera began to make more aggressive decisions. The Panthers then went 11–1 to finish the season, including a then-franchise record eight-game winning streak, to win the NFC South division and make the playoffs for the first time since 2008. For his efforts, Rivera was honored as the 2013 AP NFL Coach of the Year.

During the early part of the 2013 season, Rivera was given the nickname of "Riverboat Ron" by fans and the media after he took several risky decisions, something previously not attributed to him. The name was inspired after 19th century frontier gamblers, with Rivera later embracing it for use on his social media profiles. Rivera was also known as "Chico" during his playing time with the Chicago Bears, a common practice that the team had under head coach Mike Ditka. Rivera received the nickname from defensive coordinator Buddy Ryan, who reminded him of actor Freddie Prinze from the television series Chico and the Man.

In 2014, the Panthers recovered from a 3–8–1 start to win its final four regular-season games and clinch the NFC South for the second consecutive year. They defeated the Arizona Cardinals 27–16 in the NFC Wild Card playoff game for the team's first playoff win since 2005 before falling to the eventual NFC champion Seattle Seahawks the following week.

The team's momentum would continue in 2015, as the Panthers produced their best season in franchise history by finishing 15–1, with their only loss being against the Atlanta Falcons on the road in Week 16. Rivera was recognized as the 2015 AP NFL Coach of the Year, his second such honor. The team held the #1 seed in the NFC playoffs, where they defeated the Seahawks in the divisional round and the Arizona Cardinals in the NFC Championship Game, advancing to Super Bowl 50 against the Denver Broncos. It was the first Super Bowl in which both head coaches, Rivera and the Broncos' Gary Kubiak, had previously played in a Super Bowl. The Panthers lost the Super Bowl to the Broncos 24–10, in a game which both sides's defenses dominated.

The Panthers struggled in 2016, finishing 6–10 and out of the playoffs for the first time in four seasons. They improved in 2017 and finished with an 11–5 record, entering the playoffs, but they lost in their first game.

Rivera signed a two-year contract extension worth 15.5 million in January 2018. The Panthers finished 7–9 in the 2018 season, missing the playoffs. After a 5–7 start to the 2019 season, Rivera was fired on December 3, 2019 after nine seasons as head coach. Owner David Tepper, who bought the team in 2018, made the decision to move on from him as he wanted to build his own approach for the team. Rivera finished his career with the Panthers with four playoff appearances and a total record of 79–67–1, both of which rank first all-time in team history.

Washington Football Team / Commanders

On January 1, 2020, Rivera was hired to become the 30th head coach of the Washington Football Team, known as the Redskins at his time of hiring. At his introductory press conference, Rivera stated that he was convinced that the team was the right fit for him after having meetings with Washington owner Daniel Snyder and former head coach Joe Gibbs, which started almost immediately after he was fired from the Panthers. Rivera hired several former assistant coaches that worked under him with the Panthers, assigning Scott Turner, the son of Norv Turner, as offensive coordinator and former Jacksonville Jaguars and Oakland Raiders head coach Jack Del Rio as defensive coordinator. Rivera was also granted considerable authority over roster personnel, with him acting as the team's de facto general manager until the team hired Martin Mayhew for the role in 2021. Despite that, Rivera's final say over the team's personnel remained.

Rivera's first season with the team was met with a number of challenges, including implementing a new culture, assisting the process of changing the team's name, dealing with a vastly altered season due to the COVID-19 pandemic, and being diagnosed with cancer and undergoing treatment for it during the season. Rivera released quarterback Dwayne Haskins in December after on-field struggles and off-field controversies throughout the year. Despite all that, he led the team to a NFC East title with a record of 7–9, mirroring his 2014 Panthers team that also won the division with a losing record.

During the 2021 offseason, Rivera chose to bring in journeyman quarterback Ryan Fitzpatrick and made him the starting quarterback over Taylor Heinicke despite showing a lack of understanding of the offense during the preseason. Fitzpatrick was injured in the first game of regular season, which resulted in Heinicke being the starter for the remainder of the season with a final record of 7-10.

During the 2022 offseason, Carson Wentz was traded to the team with Rivera publicly stating he was directly responsible for the move in order for Wentz to be his new starting quarterback. Following Week 6 and a 2-4 record, Rivera named Heinicke as his starter again due to Wentz being placed on injured reserve. Despite Heinicke managing to keep the Commanders in playoff contention with five wins, three losses and one tie, and needing to win the last two remaining games of the regular season in order to make the playoffs, Rivera benched him in favor of Wentz ahead of Week 17. The Commanders would lose in Week 17 against the Cleveland Browns and Rivera was widely criticized for his post-game interview where he showed a lack of awareness that the team's loss would result in the Commanders being eliminated from playoff contention. Despite Wentz being the primary reason for the loss with a dreadful performance, Rivera stated he did not regret his decision to switch starting quarterbacks. With the 2022 regular season over, Rivera fired Scott Turner later hiring Eric Bieniemy as his new offensive coordinator and assistant head coach.

Head coaching record

Personal life and family

Rivera is Catholic and has three brothers: Steven, Michael, and John. He is married to Stephanie, whom he met while at Cal in August 1983 before marrying her in 1984. Stephanie, a Filipino American, was a point guard for the Golden Bears women's basketball team in the early 1980s and later served as a coach for the sport, most notably as an assistant for the Washington Mystics of the WNBA in 2000. The couple have two children together, Christopher and Courtney. Courtney played for the UCLA Bruins softball team in the early 2010s and has worked as a social media producer under Rivera in Carolina and Washington. Rivera's nephew Vincent was hired as a defensive quality control coach under him in Washington in 2020.

Rivera's idol while growing up was Puerto Rican baseball player Roberto Clemente, who died in a plane crash while en route to deliver aid to victims of the 1972 Nicaragua earthquake. Rivera was inducted into the California Athletics Hall of Fame in 1994. On January 5, 2015, Rivera's home in Charlotte, North Carolina caught fire and was partially damaged, but he and his family escaped without injury. Rivera held a charity yard sale there after his hiring as Washington head coach in 2020, with various Panthers apparel and merchandise up for sale that raised more than 30,000 for the humane society of Charlotte.

In August 2020, Rivera was diagnosed with squamous cell carcinoma in a lymph node of his neck. Although he has a family history with cancer, his father Eugenio was diagnosed with it while his brother Michael died from pancreatic cancer in 2015 and his mother Dolores from lung cancer in 2022, his diagnosis was discovered in its early stage. He underwent a seven-week treatment regimen that included 35 proton therapy appointments and three cycles of chemotherapy. Although Rivera missed only a total of three practices, he lost over 30 pounds and had to receive intravenous therapy during halftime of some games to relieve fatigue. A campaign known as "Rivera Strong" was organized by the team to support him. He was considered cancer free by late January 2021. In April 2021, Rivera donated $100,000 to Rich Eisen's Run Rich Run charity event for St. Jude Children's Research Hospital. He was later awarded the 2022 George Halas Award by the Pro Football Writers of America for the adversity he dealt with.

References

External links

 
 Washington Commanders bio
 Cal Bears bio
 

1962 births
Living people
All-American college football players
American football linebackers
American sportspeople of Puerto Rican descent
American sportspeople of Mexican descent
Catholics from California
California Golden Bears football players
Carolina Panthers head coaches
Chicago Bears coaches
Chicago Bears players
Coaches of American football from California
National Football League defensive coordinators
People from Fort Ord, California
Philadelphia Eagles coaches
Players of American football from California
Puerto Rican players of American football
San Diego Chargers coaches
Washington Commanders head coaches
Washington Football Team head coaches
Washington Redskins head coaches
Ed Block Courage Award recipients